John Kasich presidential campaign may refer to:

 John Kasich 2000 presidential campaign
 John Kasich 2016 presidential campaign